Metro is the regional government for the Oregon portion of the Portland metropolitan area, covering portions of Clackamas, Multnomah, and Washington Counties.  It is the only directly elected regional government and metropolitan planning organization in the United States. Metro is responsible for overseeing the Portland region's solid waste system, general planning of land use and transportation, maintaining certain regional parks and natural areas, and operating the Oregon Zoo, Oregon Convention Center, Portland's Centers for the Arts, and the Portland Expo Center.  It also distributes money from two voter-approved tax measures: one for homeless services and one for affordable housing.

History and evolution
Metro in its current form evolved from Columbia Region Association of Governments (CRAG) (1966–1978) and a predecessor Metropolitan Service District (MSD) (1957–1966). Measure 6, a 1978 statewide ballot measure established Metro, effective January 1, 1979. In 1992 voters approved a home-rule charter that identified Metro's primary mission as planning and policy making to preserve and enhance the quality of life and the environment, and changed the agency's name to Metro. This charter was amended in November 2000 when Ballot Measure 26-10 was passed by voters, although the principal changes did not take effect until January 2003. The measure eliminated the Executive Office and reorganized executive staff. The position of Executive Officer, elected by voters, was merged with that of council presiding officer, chosen annually by fellow Metro councilors, creating the position of Metro Council President.  Metro's first president was David Bragdon, who served in the office from January 2003 until September 2010.

Metro's scope has grown over time. It took over Glendoveer Golf Course, regional parks, pioneer cemeteries and the Expo Center from Multnomah County in 1994, and the City of Portland transferred management of its performing arts venues in 1989.

In 2020, Metro placed a measure on the May ballot intended to raise $250 million for homeless services. It was approved and was enacted in January 2021.  Under it, individuals with earnings of over $125,000 annually and couples with earnings over $200,000 are subject to 1% marginal income tax. Businesses with a gross revenue over $5 million are also subject to a 1% business tax.

Areas of responsibility

Regional Illegal Dumping Patrol 
Regional Illegal Dumping Patrol or RID Patrol cleans up illegal dumping and it is the designated contact for the public to report illegal dumping on public property, such as furniture, hazardous waste and construction debris.

Planning 

 Provides land use planning and is responsible for maintaining the Portland-area urban growth boundary, a legal boundary which separates urban from rural land, and is designed to reduce urban sprawl.  It coordinates with the cities and counties in the area to ensure a 20-year supply of developable land.
 Serves as the metropolitan planning organization for the area, responsible for the planning of the region's transportation system. It is a separate organization from TriMet, which operates most of the region's buses and the MAX Light Rail system.
 Responsible for the region's Geographic Information System (GIS), maintains the Regional Land Information System (RLIS).
 Oversees a $652.8 million regional bond for affordable housing.

Operations Management 

Manages more than 17,000 acres of natural areas and parks around the Portland region, including Blue Lake Regional Park, Chehalem Ridge Nature Park, Cooper Mountain Nature Park, Graham Oaks Nature Park, Oxbow Regional Park, Howell Territorial Park, Glendoveer golf course, the Sauvie Island and M. James Gleason Memorial Boat Ramps, Chinook Landing Marine Park and the Smith and Bybee Wetlands Natural Area. It also manages 14 pioneer cemeteries, including Grand Army of the Republic Cemetery, Lone Fir Cemetery and Gresham Pioneer Cemetery.
Manages a closed landfill, St. Johns Landfill, and owns the two public garbage, hazardous waste and recycling transfer stations in the region. Metro also has responsibility for the ultimate disposal of the region's solid waste and regulates private transfer stations.
Operates the Oregon Convention Center, Oregon Zoo, Portland's Centers for the Arts, and Portland Expo Center.
It has the (so far, un-exercised) authority to take over operation of the regional transportation authority, known as TriMet.

Jurisdiction, leadership 
Metro serves 24 cities, including Portland, in Clackamas, Multnomah, and Washington counties in Oregon, as well as unincorporated parts of those counties. The Metro Council consists of a president and six councilors, all directly elected by their districts, and nonpartisan. The incumbent president is Lynn Peterson, who assumed office January 7, 2019.

According to the 2020 census, the average district population for the districts used from 2011 to 2021 was 248,362 and the current population of the old districts is as follows (the populations for the newly drawn districts are yet to be determined):

Metro's approved 2020-21 Budget is $1.4 billion, with 979 FTE.

Regional plan
Metro is also the Portland regional planning organization and develops a regional master plan to coordinate future development. Metro's master plan for the region includes transit-oriented development: this approach, part of the new urbanism, promotes mixed-use and high-density development around light rail stops and transit centers, and the investment of the metropolitan area's share of federal tax dollars into multiple modes of transportation. Metro's master plan also includes multiple town centers, smaller versions of the city center, scattered throughout the metropolitan area.

In 1995 Metro introduced the 2040 plan as a way to define long term growth planning. The 2040 Growth Concept is designed to accommodate 780,000 additional people and 350,000 jobs by 2040. This plan has created some criticism from environmentalists, but few consider it a threat to Portland's legacy of urban growth management.

An April 2004 study in the Journal of the American Planning Association tried to quantify the effects of Metro's plans on Portland's urban form. While the report cautioned against finding a direct link between any single one policy and any improvements in Portland's urban form, it showed strong correlation between Metro's 2040 plan and various west-side changes in Portland. Changes cited include increased density and mixed-use development as well as improved pedestrian/non-automobile accessibility.

See also
 Clatsop Butte, East Buttes
 Mike Burton, a former head of Metro
 PaintCare and MetroPaint, paint recycling efforts involving Metro
 Regional Arts & Culture Council, partially funded by Metro
 Springwater Trail, a trail partially managed by Metro

References

External links

Ridpatrol portal for submitting illegal dumping complaints in the Portland Metropolitan area 
  Official website
Metro Council districts map
 Metro entry in the Oregon Blue Book

 
Local government in Oregon
Transportation in Portland, Oregon
Transportation planning
Urban planning in the United States
Metropolitan planning organizations
Government agencies established in 1993
1993 establishments in Oregon